Physiology is a peer-reviewed scientific journal on physiology published by the American Physiological Society and the International Union of Physiological Societies. Before August 2003, it was named News in Physiological Sciences. The current editor-in-chief is Gary C. Sieck (Mayo Clinic).

External links 
 

Bimonthly journals
English-language journals
Publications established in 1986
Physiology journals